Rekunovka is a rural locality (a khutor) in Starooskolsky District, Belgorod Oblast, Russia. The population was 11 as of 2010. There is 1 street.

Geography 
Rekunovka is located 38 km southeast of Stary Oskol (the district's administrative centre) by road. Znamenka is the nearest rural locality.

References 

Rural localities in Starooskolsky District